Jorge Osvaldo Laguna Avilés (born April 10, 1993, in Irapuato, Guanajuato) is a professional Mexican footballer who currently plays for Zacatepec.

External links

1993 births
Living people
Mexican footballers
Liga MX players
Club Atlético Zacatepec players
People from Irapuato
Association footballers not categorized by position
21st-century Mexican people